Burnakovskaya is a station on the Sormovsko–Meshcherskaya line of the Nizhny Novgorod Metro, in the Moskovsky district of Nizhny Novgorod, opened in 1993.

Background

Burnakovskaya opened on 20 December 1993. Until September 2002 with the opening of Burevestnik, it was the western terminus of the Sormovskaya line. Its name comes from the crossing of Burnakovsky and Kuibysheva Street with Sormovskiy Highway. 

It has octagonal columns lined with white marble, and walls painted red, the bottom being lined with curved red roof tiles. The floor is paved with dark granite, crossed with strips of white marble.

See also
 List of Nizhny Novgorod metro stations

References

External links 
 Station site "Walk on the metro"
 Photos of the Nizhny Novgorod Metro stations

Nizhny Novgorod Metro stations
Railway stations in Russia opened in 1993
Railway stations located underground in Russia